Flora Campbell (August 1, 1911 – November 6, 1978) was an American actress on radio, television, and stage.

Campbell was born in Oklahoma, the daughter of Mr. and Mrs. T. Bernard Campbell. She had a twin sister, Dorothy. She did her collegiate studies at the University of Chicago, studied violin at Chicago's Musical College, and won a scholarship to study acting under Eva Le Gallienne.

In the 1930s, Campbell gained early acting experience in stock theater with the Club Playhouse Group in Maryland. She appeared on Broadway in various roles in the 1930s, 1940s, 1950s and 1960s.

On radio, Campbell played Jean Lambert on Brave Tomorrow and Janice King on The Strange Romance of Evelyn Winters.

On television, Campbell played Karen St. John in Faraway Hill, Helen Emerson on Woman with a Past, Dr. Robin McKay in The Seeking Heart, Dora Foster in A Date with Judy and Helen Emerson on Valiant Lady.

On August 24, 1939, Campbell married Ben Cutler, a band leader from New York. They had two children.

She died on November 6, 1978, in Stamford, Connecticut at age 67.

References

External links
 

1911 births
1978 deaths
20th-century American actresses
American film actresses
People from Nowata, Oklahoma
Actresses from Oklahoma
American twins
University of Chicago alumni